Michael Matias Fracaro (born 8 April 1995), known simply as Michael, is a Brazilian footballer who plays as a goalkeeper.

Career
Michael made his professional debut while on loan at Grêmio Novorizontino, replacing the club's injured starting goalkeeper Tom during the 2017 Campeonato Paulista tournament.

References

External links
Profile at Soccerway

1995 births
Living people
Brazilian footballers
Association football goalkeepers
Clube Atlético Mineiro players
Guarani Esporte Clube (MG) players
Associação Atlética Caldense players
Grêmio Novorizontino players
F.C. Paços de Ferreira players
F.C. Alverca players
Brazilian expatriate footballers
Brazilian expatriate sportspeople in Portugal
Expatriate footballers in Portugal